Ingrid Mekers (born 15 May 1962) is a former Belgian racing cyclist. She won the Belgian national road race title in 1983.

References

External links

1962 births
Living people
Belgian female cyclists
Sportspeople from Hasselt
Cyclists from Limburg (Belgium)